

Season summary
On their return to the Bundesliga, Fortuna Düsseldorf avoided relegation with a respectable 13th placed finish.

Players

First team squad
Squad at end of season

References

Notes

Fortuna Düsseldorf seasons
Fortuna Düsseldorf